Hugo Urbahns (1890, Lieth – 1946, Stockholm) was a German communist revolutionary and politician.

He was involved in the Communist Party of Germany (KPD) in the 1920s.  He was jailed for his role in the Hamburg Uprising of 1923, and spent time on hunger strike.

He was expelled from the KPD in the late 1920s, and became a leader of the Leninbund, a left split from the KPD.

For a time he had links with Leon Trotsky, but they drifted apart over a number of issues, including Urbahns' development of "third campist" positions that the Soviet Union was no longer a workers' state.

References 

German communists
1890 births
1946 deaths
People from Dithmarschen
Politicians from Schleswig-Holstein
Hunger strikers
Prisoners and detainees of Germany
Anti-Stalinist left